In Greek mythology, Astacia (Ancient Greek: Ἀστακία) was a nymph whom after her Dionysus  named a city.

References 

Nymphs